Kurts Plade (16 August 1898 – February 1945) was a Latvian footballer. He played in one match for the Latvia national football team in 1923.

References

External links
 

1898 births
1945 deaths
Latvian footballers
Latvia international footballers
Footballers from Riga
Association football defenders